Verkhny Sutay (Deede Hutai) is a rural locality (a selo) in Mukhorshibirsky District, Republic of Buryatia, Russia. The population was 70 as of 2010. There are 2 streets.

Geography 
Verkhny Sutay is located 63 km north of Mukhorshibir (the district's administrative centre) by road. Narsata is the nearest rural locality.

References 

Rural localities in Mukhorshibirsky District